Upper Glastonbury is a rural locality in the Gympie Region, Queensland, Australia. In the  Upper Glastonbury had a population of 49 people.

Geography 
The Glastonbury National Park is in two sections, one in the north-east of the locality and the other just east of centre. Connecting the two sections is the Marys Creek State Forest which occupies the east and south-east of the locality. The Glastonbury State Forest is in the north of the locality.

Apart from the above protected areas, the land use is grazing on native vegetation.

History 
In the  Upper Glastonbury had a population of 49 people.

References 

Gympie Region
Localities in Queensland